Saint-Antonin is a commune in the Gers department in southwestern France. It is located near Auch and Mauvezin.

Geography

Population

See also
Communes of the Gers department

References

Landscape 
It is mostly made up farms and has a lot of fields. Some crops that are grown are corn, sunflowers, and wheat. There are some people who live yearly in the village. There is 145 people but the village is spread and could fit over 750 people. There is a tennis court in the middle of the village. Since the village is spread, so are the houses and farms (in the middle of this is fields for the crops). This is the reason why the center of the village has fewer than ten buildings.

Communes of Gers